The Angel's Message To Me is the first studio album collaboration by Chris Brokaw and Geoff Farina as a duo. It was released on Damnably in the UK on March 18, 2010, and on Capitan Records in the US on May 6, 2010. The album is a collection of covers of pre-WWII North American blues, folk and ragtime classics by the likes of Reverend Gary Davis, Blind Blake, The Kentucky Ramblers, and Leroy Carr. 
 
The album was recorded by Live Skull guitarist Mark C at Deep Sea studio, in New York City, and Geoff Farina at Hev-E-Kreem, Somerville, MA, and was subsequently mastered at Peerless Mastering.

Track listing

References

External links 
 Chris Brokaw official site
 Geoff Farina official site
 Damnably.com

2010 albums